The University of Northern Philippines (UNP) is a university in Barangay Tamag, in the City of Vigan in the province of Ilocos Sur, Philippines. It is the first and oldest state university in Northern Luzon which offers low tuition fee, tracing its roots to 1906, which is older than the University of the Philippines by two years. It is the only state university in the province aimed for less-fortunate people and one of three state-owned educational institutions of higher learning operating in Ilocos Sur (with the Ilocos Sur Polytechnic State College and the Northern Luzon Polytechnic State College, a former branch of the university).

History
The university began as the Vigan High School (present-day Ilocos Sur National High School) in 1906. Its shop department was converted into a separate intermediate level school, named the Vigan Trade School in 1910. It opened its high school in 1927 and produced its first graduates in 1931, when it evolved as the Ilocos Sur Trade School. They were both in Vigan town. Two of the buildings still exist: one being used as a warehouse for a construction supply firm, the other is the location of the Vigan City Trade Center.

President Manuel Luis Quezon converted the Ilocos Sur Trade School in 1941 through the help of Assemblyman Benito T. Soliven and Governor Pedro Singson Reyes. However, World War II halted its implementation.

In 1951 the Ilocos Sur Trade School became the Northern Luzon School of Arts and Trades (NLSAT) by virtue of Republic Act 547. However, Republic Act 2700, or the General Appropriations Act of 1960, converted it back to Ilocos Sur School of Arts and Trades (ISSAT).

It proved temporary: On June 19, 1965, then-Congressman Floro S. Crisologo authored Republic Act 4449. It was signed into law at the Philippine Embassy in Roppongi, Tokyo, Japan, converting ISSAT into the University of Northern Philippines. It then began implementing its Charter on October 14, 1965. Crisologo is recognized as the founder of the university.

The Candon Community College (CCC) was incorporated into the university in 1989 through Republic Act 6744, through the efforts of then-Congressman Eric D. Singson. It acted as a semi-autonomous unit.  Despite this semi-autonomous status, CCC was split from the university by virtue of Republic Act 10085, also by Singson, to become the Northern Luzon Polytechnic State College in 2010.

In the late 1980s the commitment of the university to the new Stepladder Nursing Curriculum pioneered in Palo, Leyte was marked by the construction of the College of Health Sciences building, formerly the tallest building in the university (the under-construction Ladies' Dormitory Building will become the tallest) and one of the tallest in Ilocos Sur, finished in 1997. It currently houses the individual Colleges of Nursing and Health Sciences, and the university-owned radio station dwNP.

In 2008 the university's FM radio station, dwNP Campus Radio, was relaunched. It occupies the 100.5 MHz frequency, moving from its old, weak 88.5 MHz frequency.

In 2009 two devastating fires struck the university, part of the Father Jose Burgos Hall, which houses the College of Arts and Sciences and the Elpidio Quirino Hall, which houses the University Administration. Despite these setbacks, especially to the Administration Building, the university fully recovered in a few months and construction of a bigger three-story Administration Building was started to replace it. Offices once occupying the burned Administration Building has been temporarily transferred to the Graduate School's E-Library Building, while the President's Office occupied three rooms in the Lauro B. Tacbas (Criminology) Building.  The new Administration building has been inaugurated in 2014 and it now houses all administration offices.

The University Infirmary was due for completion in 2009 but was delayed to give priority to the construction of the Administration Building. It was inaugurated on July 4, 2011. The fully operational hospital now houses the College of Medicine, which was spun off from the College of Health Sciences starting SY 2014–2015.

Under the administration of University President Gilbert R. Arce, an unprecedented sweeping wave of reforms led to various successes in the local, national, and even international scenes.  During this period, amidst organizational reforms (including the shifting of the opening of the school year to the month of August—-the first to do so in Ilocos Sur) and infrastructure changes (including the building of a new Gymnasium, the University Hostel, and the tallest in-campus Dormitory Building in Ilocos Sur (still under construction)), the university attained attention when two of its graduates from the College of Medicine landed First in the Medical Council of India board examinations.

Campuses
 Vigan (Tamag) Campus houses most of its 14 core colleges, the University Infirmary, and the university's FM radio station
 Sinait Campus houses the Upland Research and Development Center
 Santo Domingo (Quimmarayan) Campus houses the agricultural, fishery and research courses; and the Environmental Research and Training Center
 Santa Maria (Nalvo) Campus houses the Marine Research and Development Center

Graduate school
Due to the implementation of Vertical Articulation, all of its courses have been transferred under the jurisdiction of appropriate colleges, thus abolishing the Graduate School as a separate entity.
 Doctor of Education
 Doctor of Public Administration
 Doctor of Business Administration
 Master of Arts in Education: Educational Management, Guidance
 Master of Public Administration: Local Government, Government Administration, Police Administration
 Master of Arts in Teaching: English, Filipino, Practical Arts, Home Economics, Health Education, Physical Education, Nursing
 Master of Science in Teaching: Physics, Chemistry
 Master of Arts in Mathematics Education
 Master of Statistics
 Master of Business Administration
 Master of Arts in Nursing 
 Master of Guidance & Counseling

Open University
 Bachelor of Science in Criminology
 Master of Public Administration
 Master in Social Work
 Master of Arts in Nursing
 Master of Arts in Education: Science Education, Mathematics Education

College of Law
 Bachelor of Laws

College of Architecture
 Bachelor of Science in Architecture
 Bachelor of Science in Interior Design
 Certificate in Architectural Interiors
 Certificate in Building Technology
 Certificate in Landscape Gardening

College of Engineering
 Bachelor of Science in Civil Engineering
 Bachelor of Science in Geodetic Engineering
 Bachelor of Science in Sanitary Engineering

College of Arts and Sciences
 Bachelor of Arts in Communication
 Bachelor of Arts in Political Science
 Bachelor of Arts in English
 Bachelor of Science in Psychology
 Bachelor of Science in Biology
 Bachelor of Science in Marine Biology
 Bachelor of Science in Environmental Studies
 Bachelor of Science in Mathematics
 Bachelor of Science in Physics
 Bachelor of Science in Statistics

College of Business Administration and Accountancy
 Bachelor of Science in Accountancy
 Bachelor of Science in Business Administration: Human Resources Development Management, Financial Management
 Bachelor of Science in Entrepreneurship
 Bachelor of Science in Cooperative Management
 Associate in Office Management

College of Communication and Information Technology
 Bachelor of Science in Computer Science
 Bachelor of Science in Information Technology
 One-year Computer Technology

College of Criminology
 Master in Criminal Justice
 Bachelor of Science in Criminology
 Bachelor of Science in Law Enforcement Administration

College of Social Work
 Bachelor of Science in Social Work

College of Fine Arts
 Bachelor of Fine Arts: Advertising Arts, Painting
 Associate in Commercial Arts
 Bachelor of Science in Interior Design

College of Health Sciences
This college, organized as the Institute of Community Health, originally intended to lead students into Medicine (as Level V) through a Step-Ladder version of the Bachelor of Science in Nursing curriculum as a Department of Health pilot project.  It once attracted DOH scholars from as far as Region III.  The BSN program of the college has been absorbed by the College of Nursing, and Level V has been spun off as the College of Medicine.

The college is currently offering the following courses:

 Bachelor of Science in Midwifery - an evolution of the former Level II of the BSN Step-Ladder Curriculum—Certificate in Midwifery
 Bachelor of Science in Community Health Management - contains elements of the former Level III of the BSN Step-Ladder Curriculum—Advanced Paramedics, and the only remaining Step Ladder-type course in the college
 Bachelor of Science in Medical Laboratory Science - one of two offered in the whole of the Ilocos Region

College of Nursing
 Bachelor of Science in Nursing

College of Teacher Education
The university's College of Teacher Education is a Center of Development.

 Bachelor of Elementary Education: General Education, Early Childhood Education, Special Education (new)
 Bachelor of Secondary Education: English, Filipino, Mathematics, Physical Sciences, Biological Sciences, Home Economics, Guidance Counseling, MAPEH, Social Sciences, General Science, Physical Education
 Bachelor of Science in Industrial Education: Electronics Technology, Automotive Technology, Home Economics, Practical Arts, Electrical Technology
 Bachelor of Library & Information Science: Academic Librarianship

College of Tourism & Hospitality Management
 Bachelor of Science in Hotel & Restaurant Administration
 Bachelor of Arts in Tourism.

College of Public Administration & Governance
 Bachelor of Arts in Public Administration

College of Technology
 Bachelor of Science in Industrial Technology: Automotive, Electronics, Electricity
 Two-year Technical Course, Automotive, Electronics, Electricity
 One-year Special Course: Automechanics, Practical Electricity, Radio Mechanics, Refrigeration & Air Conditioning

Laboratory Schools Basic Education
 K to 12

Presidents
Dr. Dedicacion Agatep-Reyes (founding president, 1972–1978)
Dr. Romualdo Tadena (1978-1985)
Dr. Dorotea Campos-Filart (1985-1998)
Dr. Lauro Tacbas (1998-2011)
Dr. Gilbert Arce (2011–2019)
Dr. Erwin F. Cadorna (2019–present)

Student Council Presidents/Student Regents
The UNP University Student Council (UNP - USC) had always been the forefront of student governing bodies in Northern Luzon. With its autonomy and governing power given by the UNP Board of Regents, the UNP - USC has been an active workforce and influence on other educational institutions in Luzon and the entire country. This includes outside participation of the council on local and national issues and its outstanding stand on issues affecting the students.

In 1997, Cornelio Rebuldela became the First Student Regent of the university. Rebuldela's administration had paved the way to a plebiscite that moved the Student Council elections held late June to March before semester closes. In 1998, Maria Rosario Quitoriano, was the first president to be elected in March and had sworn-in in the next school year. A notable accomplishment of her administration was the launch of Gawad Crisologo which recognized the talents of students as a tribute to the founder of the university.

Major accomplishments includes major infrastructure projects on Rallojay, de Vera and Torricer's incumbency as presidents and Student Regents for the university's Board of Regents. Ragunton's term made an immediate action on the issues being equaled to the council to return its reputation after a scandalous money laundering issue on Alegre's incumbency. In 2001, Student Council President Julio Alegre, then a junior Mass Communications student, laundered close to half a million pesos in Student Council Funds. He was not able to continue his studies and is currently at large.

Erwin Rallojay has formed a strong set of council officers and has set new implementing guidelines on student governance.

De Vera's term introduced the Student Council Volunteer Corp. He also became the Region I Chairperson of the National Confederation of Student Regents of the Philippines (NCSRT). The UNP - USC were able to sponsor a National Seminar on Environmental Summit and was the first to stage the Miss Earth UNP which is different from the Miss UNP Beauty and Brains Pageant held every year. The referendum for the Student Council's Constitution and By Laws was also conducted. Majority of the almost 13,000 student population for 2003 of the university voted for "YES" with the said referendum.

Torricer's term marks another milestone on the Student Council achievements. After the referendum, Emilio Arnold Torricer became the first president under the New SC Constitution and By Laws and having three vice presidents namely; Vice President for Operations, Student Concerns and UNP - Candon City Campus. He also became the Regional Commissioner of the National League of Student Regents and Trustees of State Universities and Colleges of the Philippines (NLSRTP) as mandated by CHED, PASUC and the National Youth Commission (NYC).

Additional working umbrella organizations under the University Student Council has been conceived because of the New Constitution and by Laws. The Council of Students Interest Groups (CSIG) which is composed of 42 Accredited Organizations of the university, the Mandated Organizations (includes mother organizations of each 14 Colleges) and the PROFRAT (Peaceful, Responsible and Organized Fraternities) which has 17 member fraternities and sororities.

The Student Council has undergone several changes and adjustment with the new constitution. During the year, they first staged the Student Fair and the first ever Mr. and Miss UNP.

A new strong blood emerges at the College of Nursing, Warren Rafal visualize a service-oriented Student Council that caters pro-student activities and projects. He acknowledges the importance of student facility improvement and provide LCD projectors for medical and nursing colleges, machinery for hands-on in technology colleges and educational material in instruction colleges.

During Rafal's term, the Student Fair was transformed to Student Festival which highlights all activities of the student council like Body painting, Street painting, Larong Pinoy, Dance Craze, Battle of the Bands, SYMBO game (Bingo type game which uses chemical symbols), and Student's cocktail street party.

Aside from quizzes, student development programs, career sponsorships, leadership seminars, the dependability of the UNP - USC has been proven worthy by time.

The present administration of the USC has been affected with other much difficult issues and was believed to have lost in track in serving the students. It stands by this motto: "The Students' Voice is OUR Voice."

The last Student Council elections became controversial when a disqualification case was filed against Cesar Borillo Jr. But the students' voice had prevailed. Winning an overwhelming votes from those who believe in him had become his vindication. At the end, Borillo was declared as the new Student Regent. The said election controversy was even discussed by a national television station through its regional bureaus' local newscast.

However, Borillo has proven them that he is worthy of the position. He has been consistently showing good performances during Board meetings.

The 44th foundation celebrations were made remarkable because of the activities that the Student Council conducted. For now, the present UNP Student Council with the undying support of the UNP administration paved way in the building of the Students' Study Haven and boats were also stationed at the UNP lagoon for the use of every UNPian.

University student publications
All academic departments in the university have their own publications, with the university's main school publication being the New Tandem,  and Layap as its literary folio.  The university's official publication is the UNP Chronicle.

The University Chapter of the Junior Philippine Institute of Accountants has its own publication, The Ledger.

See also
List of state schools, colleges and universities in the Philippines

References

External links

Universities and colleges in Ilocos Sur
Education in Vigan
State universities and colleges in the Philippines
Philippine Association of State Universities and Colleges